The Housing of the Working Classes Act 1900 (63 & 64 Vict. c. 59) was an Act of the Parliament of the United Kingdom.

Background
The Housing of the Working Classes Act 1885 was a public health act, not a housing act. It empowered local authorities to condemn slum housing, but not to purchase the land or finance new housing. The Housing of the Working Classes Act 1890 gave urban authorities the legal power to buy land and to construct tenements and housing estates. The 1900 act empowered authorities to purchase land for the same purpose outside of their jurisdictions.

The 1890 Act
The 1890 act is made up of four parts and seven schedules.

The Housing of the Working Classes Act 1894 amended the financial provisions of part 2 of the principal Act.

The 1900 Act
This act was an extension to the 1890 Act to empower authorities (other than rural district councils) under part 3 of the 1890 Act to acquire land for housing purposes outside the area over which they have jurisdiction, and permitting metropolitan borough councils, if they so desire, to become authorities under part 3 of the principal Act.

Implications
This gave local authorities the legal power to buy land through compulsory purchase and to construct tenements and housing estates. Part 3 of the principal Act allowed the Council to:

See also
Boundary Estate

References

Further reading

External links
Guide to the reports of the Royal Commission on the Housing of the Working Classes.

United Kingdom Acts of Parliament 1900
Housing in the United Kingdom
Housing legislation in the United Kingdom